Ernst Blass (17 October 17, 1890, (Berlin) – 23 January 23, 1939 (Berlin), (pseudonyms: Daniel Stabler and Erich Sternow) was an important expressionist poet, critic and writer.

Blass was a close friend of Kurt Hiller and joined him at Der Neue Club, alongside other writers of early Expressionism, Georg Heym and Jakob van Hoddis. From 1911, he collaborated with the magazine Die Aktion, before distancing himself from Franz Pfemfert in 1914.

In Das Wesen der neuen Tanzkunst (The essence of the new dance art) Blass set out to identify abstract categories whereby "a new dance art" could be outlined. He described how the anthroposophical breathing methods taught at Loheland could transform the "marionette" into an animal form which could then leap in an ecstatic manner. In this he was responding to previous theories of dance, such as produced by Heinrich von Kleist who had written in 1807 a short text "Über dem Marionette Theater" according to which the dancer became a marionnette without either will or consciousness.

In 1980 Thomas B. Schumann published a three volume collection of Blass' poetry (Volume 1), short stories (Volume 2) and various essays (Volume 3).

Works
 1912 Die Straßen komme ich entlang geweht
 1915 Die Gedichte von Trennung und Licht
 1918 Die Gedichte von Sommer und Tod
 1920 Über den Stil Stefan Georges
 1921 Das Wesen der neuen Tanzkunst
 1930 Der paradiesische Augenblick

References

Further reading
 

1890 births
1939 deaths
20th-century German poets
German male poets
20th-century German male writers